Cuyo Airport  is an airport serving the municipalities of Magsaysay, Cuyo, and Agutaya. It is located within the boundaries of Barangay Lucbuan and Emilod in the town of Magsaysay in the main island of Cuyo Island.  It is one of several airports in Palawan, the other being Puerto Princesa Airport, Cesar Lim Rodriguez Airport, El Nido Airport and Francisco Reyes Airport in the municipality of Busuanga.  It is classified as a feeder airport by the Civil Aviation Authority of the Philippines, a body of the Department of Transportation that is responsible for the operations of not only this airport but also of all other airports in the Philippines except the major international airports.

Airlines and destinations

See also
List of airports in the Philippines

References

External links
Photographs of Cuyo Airport at Panoramio

Airports in the Philippines
Buildings and structures in Palawan